Uroš Momić (born 26 March 1992), commonly known as Momo is a Serbian footballer who plays as a forward for Radnički Pirot. During the 2019-20 Utica City season, he was introduced by his nickname Momo, and he made the MASL All-Rookie Honorable Mention.

External links

1992 births
Living people
Serbian footballers
Sportspeople from Smederevo
Association football forwards
Harcum College alumni
Bryant and Stratton College alumni
FK ČSK Čelarevo players
FK Smederevo players
FK Radnički Pirot players
FK Dolina Padina players
Serbian SuperLiga players
Serbian First League players
National Premier Soccer League players
Utica City FC players
Serbian expatriate footballers
Expatriate soccer players in the United States
Serbian expatriate sportspeople in the United States